Mesorhizobium opportunistum is a bacterium from the genus Mesorhizobium which was isolated from Biserrula pelecinus in Australia.

References

External links
Type strain of Mesorhizobium opportunistum at BacDive -  the Bacterial Diversity Metadatabase

Phyllobacteriaceae
Bacteria described in 2009